A literary magazine is a periodical devoted to literature in a broad sense. Literary magazines usually publish short stories, poetry, and essays, along with literary criticism, book reviews, biographical profiles of authors, interviews and letters. Literary magazines are often called literary journals, or little magazines, terms intended to contrast them with larger, commercial magazines.

History 
Nouvelles de la république des lettres is regarded as the first literary magazine; it was established by Pierre Bayle in France in 1684. Literary magazines became common in the early part of the 19th century, mirroring an overall rise in the number of books, magazines, and scholarly journals being published at that time. In Great Britain, critics Francis Jeffrey, Henry Brougham and Sydney Smith founded the Edinburgh Review in 1802. Other British reviews of this period included the Westminster Review (1824), The Spectator (1828), and Athenaeum (1828). In the United States, early journals included the Philadelphia Literary Magazine (1803–1808), the Monthly Anthology (1803–11), which became the North American Review, the Yale Review (founded in 1819), The Yankee (1828–1829) The Knickerbocker (1833–1865), Dial (1840–44) and the New Orleans-based De Bow's Review (1846–80). Several prominent literary magazines were published in Charleston, South Carolina, including The Southern Review (1828–32) and Russell's Magazine (1857–60). The most prominent Canadian literary magazine of the 19th century was the Montreal-based Literary Garland.

The North American Review, founded in 1815, is the oldest American literary magazine. However, it had its publication suspended during World War II, and the Yale Review (founded in 1819) did not; thus the Yale journal is the oldest literary magazine in continuous publication. Begun in 1889, Poet Lore is considered the oldest journal dedicated to poetry. By the end of the century, literary magazines had become an important feature of intellectual life in many parts of the world. One of the most notable 19th century literary magazines of the Arabic-speaking world was Al-Urwah al-Wuthqa.

Among the literary magazines that began in the early part of the 20th century is Poetry magazine. Founded in 1912, it published T. S. Eliot's first poem, "The Love Song of J. Alfred Prufrock". Other important early-20th century literary magazines include The Times Literary Supplement (1902), Southwest Review (1915), Virginia Quarterly Review (1925), World Literature Today (founded in 1927 as Books Abroad before assuming its present name in 1977), Southern Review (1935), and New Letters (1935). The Sewanee Review, although founded in 1892, achieved prominence largely thanks to Allen Tate, who became editor in 1944.

Two of the most influential—though radically different—journals of the last half of the 20th century were The Kenyon Review (KR) and the Partisan Review. The Kenyon Review, edited by John Crowe Ransom, espoused the so-called New Criticism. Its platform was avowedly unpolitical. Although Ransom came from the South and published authors from that region, KR also published many New York-based and international authors. The Partisan Review was first associated with the American Communist Party and the John Reed Club; however, it soon broke ranks with the party. Nevertheless, politics remained central to its character, while it also published significant literature and criticism.

The middle-20th century saw a boom in the number of literary magazines, which corresponded with the rise of the small press. Among the important journals which began in this period were Nimbus: A Magazine of Literature, the Arts, and New Ideas, which began publication in 1951 in England, the Paris Review, which was founded in 1953, The Massachusetts Review and Poetry Northwest, which were founded in 1959, X Magazine, which ran from 1959 to 1962, and the Denver Quarterly, which began in 1965. The 1970s saw another surge in the number of literary magazines, with a number of distinguished journals getting their start during this decade, including Columbia: A Journal of Literature and Art, Ploughshares, The Iowa Review, Granta, Agni, The Missouri Review, and New England Review. Other highly regarded print magazines of recent years include The Threepenny Review, The Georgia Review, Ascent, Shenandoah, The Greensboro Review, ZYZZYVA, Glimmer Train, Tin House, Half Mystic Journal, the Canadian magazine Brick, the Australian magazine HEAT, and Zoetrope: All-Story. Some short fiction writers, such as Steve Almond, Jacob M. Appel and Stephen Dixon have built national reputations in the United States primarily through publication in literary magazines.

The Committee of Small Magazine Editors and Publishers (COSMEP) was founded by Richard Morris in 1968. It was an attempt to organize the energy of the small presses. Len Fulton, editor and founder of Dustbook Publishing, assembled and published the first real list of these small magazines and their editors in the mid-1970s. This made it possible for poets to pick and choose the publications most amenable to their work and the vitality of these independent publishers was recognized by the larger community, including the National Endowment for the Arts, which created a committee to distribute support money for this burgeoning group of publishers called the Coordinating Council of Literary Magazines (CCLM). This organisation evolved into the Council of Literary Magazines and Presses (CLMP).

Many prestigious awards exist for works published in literary magazines including the Pushcart Prize and the O. Henry Awards. Literary magazines also provide many of the pieces in The Best American Short Stories and The Best American Essays annual volumes.

Online literary magazines 
SwiftCurrent, created in 1984, was the first online literary magazine. It functioned as more of a database of literary works than a literary publication. In 1995, the Mississippi Review was the first large literary magazine to launch a fully online issue. By 1998, Fence and Timothy McSweeney's Quarterly Concern were published and quickly gained an audience. Around 1996, literary magazines began to appear more regularly online. At first, some writers and readers dismissed online literary magazines as not equal in quality or prestige to their print counterparts, while others said that these were not properly magazines and were instead ezines. One of the first literary magazines was The Morpo Review, published by a group from Omaha, Nebraska, in the 1990s. Since then, though, many writers and readers have accepted online literary magazines as another step in the evolution of independent literary journals.

There are thousands of online literary publications and it is difficult to judge the quality and overall impact of this relatively new publishing medium.

Little magazines

Little magazines, or "small magazines", are literary magazines that often publish experimental literature and the non-conformist writings of relatively unknown writers. Typically they had small readership, were financially uncertain or non-commercial, were irregularly published and showcased artistic innovation.

See also 
 List of literary magazines
 Literary fiction
 Creative nonfiction
 Short story
 Anthology
 Poetry
 Non fiction

References

Further reading
 Brooker, Peter; Thacker, Andrew. "The Oxford critical and cultural history of modernist magazines, Volume One: Britain and Ireland 1880–1955". Oxford University Press. .

External links 

 Council of Literary Magazines and Small Presses
 The Little Magazine a Hundred Years On A Reader's Report by Steve Evans
 Little Magazine Interview Index Housed at the University of Wisconsin–Madison Special Collections, the Little Magazine Collection, one of the most extensive of its kind in the United States, includes approximately 7,000 English-language literary magazines published in the United States, Great Britain, Canada, and Australia/New Zealand, mostly in the 20th century.
 Little Magazine Collection Blog Housed at the University of Wisconsin-Madison
 NewPages Guide to Literary Magazines in Print and Online.
 Poets & Writers Literary Magazine Database
 EWR: Literary Magazines Searchable listing of Literary Magazines

 
Magazine genres